

History
The House of Bonaparte was a royal dynasty started by Napoleon I, son of Carlo Bonaparte. The family formed the Imperial House of France during the first French Empire. The house last ruled until 1871, when they were ultimately ousted due to the effects of the Franco-Prussian War. Here are their individual seals:

References

French heraldry
Bonaparte